Lophodermium seditiosum is a plant pathogen which infects pine trees..

References

External links 
 Index Fungorum
 USDA ARS Fungal Database

Fungal tree pathogens and diseases
Leotiomycetes